Holmby Productions, Inc. v. Vaughn, 177 Kan. 728 (1955), 282 P.2d 412, is a Kansas Supreme Court case in which the Kansas State Board of Review, the state censorship board, and the attorney defendants appealed the decision of the District Court of Wyandotte County. It was found that the law that allowed the board to deny a request for a permit allowing United Artists to show the motion picture The Moon is Blue in Kansas theaters was unconstitutional, and an injunction was issued prohibiting the defendants from stopping the exhibition of the film in Kansas.

Background
Holmby productions, the owner of the film The Moon is Blue, and its exclusive worldwide distributor, United Artists Corporation, pursuant to a Kansas statute (G.S. 1949, 51-103), applied for a license from the Kansas State Board of Review to distribute the film in Kansas. On June 17, 1953, the board disapproved the film:

Appeal
The owner and distributor decided to appeal and filed suit in the District Court of Wyandotte County. After a trial, the court found the statute unconstitutional, saying that  a permanent injunction was entered against the defendants, prohibiting them from stopping the exhibition of the film.

Re-examination
After the injunction was granted, on September 11, 1953, the board re-examined the film, and again disapproved the film, saying  Being unable to stop exhibition of the film it had rejected twice, the Board appealed.

Supreme Court of Kansas 
The Supreme Court of Kansas overturned the district court and found that that the board being an executive branch agency, neither the District Court nor it could substitute its own opinion of the film, and there was no abuse of discretion on the part of the board. The court said,

Meaning of words and prior restraint 
The court went on to use ordinary dictionary entries to show the words have clearly-defined meanings. The court then looked at the plaintiff's argument that the board represented censorship or prior restraint. Examining a number of U.S. Supreme Court cases, the court looked first at Near v. Minnesota, 283 U.S. 697, 75 L.ed. 1357, 51 S.Ct. 625, (prior restraint of newspapers is unconstitutional), in which Justice Hughes said,  The court also looked at Chaplinsky v. New Hampshire, 315 U.S. 568, 86 L.ed. 1031, 62 S.Ct. 766, ("fighting words" are not protected by the First Amendment) where Justice Murphy stated, 
The court then went on to look at a US Supreme Court case both sides had referenced, Joseph Burstyn, Inc. v. Wilson, 343 U.S. 495, 96 L.ed. 1098; 72 S.Ct. 777  (New York state motion picture licensing system similar to the one in Kansas, which prohibited "sacrilegious" films was unconstitutional)  in which the U.S. Supreme Court said,

Findings 
Since the court in Burstyn had excepted obscenity  from First Amendment protection, the State Board of Review classifying the film as obscene meant the Board was within its power to ban the film. The court overturned the decision of the trial court and instructed it to reinstate the decision of the Board.

US Supreme Court
United Artists, the distributor, appealed to the US Supreme Court. The decision per curiam (by the entire court), Holmby Productions, Inc. v. Vaughn, 350 U.S. 870, literally consisted entirely of   The use of a "shotgun approach" to obscenity was disaowed and overturned.

Aftermath 
As a result, the distributor was now able to exhibit the film in Kansas. The decision of the US Supreme Court reversing the case was recognized by the highest courts of other states that Kansas's Censorship Statute was unconstitutional. The US Supreme Court, in Interstate Circuit, Inc. v. Dallas, recognized that its decision in Holmby struck down the Kansas Film Censorship statute as unconstitutional.

Ten years later, in Freedman v. Maryland, the US Supreme Court ruled that censorship boards had no power to ban a film andthat  laws allowing bans were unconstitutional. A board could approve a film or had to sue to stop a film's exhibition.

See also

 List of United States Supreme Court cases, volume 350

References 

 1955 in United States case law
 United States Supreme Court cases
 United States Free Speech Clause case law 
 United States Supreme Court cases of the Vinson Court 
 Film censorship in the United States
 Film controversies in the United States
 20th-century American trials
 Kansas state case law